The A30 motorway is a motorway in the Netherlands. It is located entirely in the Dutch province of Gelderland.

Overview
The 18 kilometer long motorway connects the A12 motorway near Ede with the A1 near Barneveld. No European routes travel along the A30 motorway.

The section near the A1 motorway is not built at motorway standards. On some connections, for example between the A30 and the eastern section of the A1, drivers will have to pass traffic lights. For the busy relations between the A30 and the western part of the A1 and vice versa, bypasses have been created to avoid heavy congestion.

Exit list

References

External links

Motorways in the Netherlands
Motorways in Gelderland
Barneveld (municipality)
Ede, Netherlands
Scherpenzeel, Gelderland